An Otter Study is a 1912 British short black-and-white silent documentary film, produced by Kineto, featuring an otter in its natural habitat, including groundbreaking footage of underwater hunting scenes. The film provided a novel treatment of the creature, which had previously appeared on film only as the victim of hunt films, with the unique underwater footage, shot by a cameraman behind glass in a tank concealed on the bed of the river in the opening scene, and a concluding scene, excised from the surviving print, in which it escapes the hunters. It was long thought lost until footage from a 1920s Visual Education re-release of the film, re-edited under the supervision of Professor J Arthur Thomson of Aberdeen University's Natural History Department, was rediscovered.

References

1912 documentary films
British black-and-white films
British short documentary films
British silent short films
Black-and-white documentary films
Films about otters
1910s short documentary films
1910s British films